William Cotter (born 10 February 1943) is a former Irish Fine Gael politician

A school principal before entering politics, he was elected to Dáil Éireann on his first attempt, when he stood in the Cavan–Monaghan constituency at the 1989 general election to the 26th Dáil. He lost his seat at the 1992 general election, but at the subsequent elections to the 20th Seanad he was elected on the Labour Panel.

At the 1997 general election, he was stood again in Cavan–Monaghan, but did not regain his seat. He  was also defeated at the following elections to the 21st Seanad, and did not stand again for either the Dáil or Seanad.

He was an elected member of Monaghan County Council for the Carrickmacross Electoral Area from 1985 until 1999.

References

1943 births
Living people
Fine Gael senators
Fine Gael TDs
Heads of schools in Ireland
Irish schoolteachers
Local councillors in County Monaghan
Members of the 26th Dáil
Members of the 20th Seanad
Bill